Saint Theodoret or Saint Theodoritus ("God given"; died October 22, 362) was a Greek-speaking Syrian Christian priest who died a martyr in Antioch during the reign of Emperor Julian the Apostate. His life is recorded only by apologetic works. His relics were later taken to Uzès in the south of France and placed in the cathedral, which is dedicated to him.

Life
Emperor Julian the Apostate, who was the nephew of the Emperor Constantine I, made his uncle Julian a count and governor of the East. Hearing that in the treasury of one of churches of Antioch there was much wealth, Count Julian was determined to seize it and published a proclamation banning the clergy. Theodoret, a priest, who was keeper of the sacred vessels, refused to abandon his flock and continued publicly to celebrate the Divine Liturgy. Count Julian ordered that he should be arrested and brought before him, with his hands bound behind his back. Count Julian accused him of having destroyed the statues of the gods in a previous reign. Theodoret retorted by reproaching the Count with his apostasy. Count Julian now ordered that Theodoret should be tortured, and in consequence, the most atrocious torments were heaped upon this heroic priest, who bore them all with courage for the sake of his faith. It was said that Theodoret spoke these words to Count Julian and to the magistrate: "O most wretched man," he said, "you know well that at the day of judgment the crucified God Whom you blaspheme will send you and the tyrant whom you serve to hell." He was later beheaded on October 22, 362.

References

"Lives of the Saints, For Every Day of the Year," edited by Rev. Hugo Hoever, S.O.Cist., Ph.D., New York: Catholic Book Publishing Co., 1955, 511 pp.

External links
Catholic Online - Saints & Angels: St. Theodoret of Antioch
Lives of the Saints by Alban Butler, Benziger Bros. Edition: St. Theodoret
Nominis.fr: Théodorit d'Uzès 

4th-century births
362 deaths
Year of birth unknown
People from Antioch
Syrian Christian clergy
Saints from Roman Anatolia
4th-century Christian saints
4th-century Christian clergy
Syrian Christian saints